Diane Messina Stanley (born 1946) is an American television writer and producer.

Positions held
Strong Medicine, Judging Amy, Knots Landing, The Young and the Restless (Breakdown Writer), Harper Valley P.T.A., House Calls, That's Life, Savannah, Homefront, Early Edition, Pacific Palisades, Army Wives, and Road To Avonlea. She also developed Spyder Games with her husband, James Stanley.

Awards and nominations
Primetime Emmy Award: Outstanding Drama Series (Homefront, 1993) (nomination shared with Lynn Marie Latham, Bernard Lechowick, David Jacobs, Christopher Chulack, and her husband)
Imagen Foundation Awards: Best Primetime TV Series (Second Chances, 1993)
Viewers For Quality Television Awards (Homefront, 1991)
Sentinel for Health Award (Army Wives, 2010, with writing staff)
Donate Life Inspire Award (Army Wives, 2010, with writing staff)

References 
Interview Deseret News

Development watch: The Futon Critic
TV.com Profile,
Official site: Strong Medicine Sony Pictures Television
Variety
Knots Landing Cast List

American soap opera writers
People from Chatsworth, Los Angeles
Television producers from California
American women television producers
Living people
American women television writers
Women soap opera writers
Screenwriters from California
1946 births
21st-century American women